Spectamen exiguum is a species of sea snail, a marine gastropod mollusk in the family Solariellidae. This marine species is endemic to New Zealand off Three Kings Islands at depths between 42 m and 46 m.

References

exiguum
Gastropods of New Zealand
Gastropods described in 1999